Gurab or Goorab or Gorab or Gorrab may refer to:
 Gurab, Fars
 Gurab, Rostam, Fars Province
 Gurab, Rasht, Gilan Province
 Gurab, Sowme'eh Sara, Gilan Province
 Gurab Javar, Gilan Province
 Gurab-e Lishavandan, Gilan Province
 Gurab Varzal, Gilan Province
 Gorab, Ilam
 Gurab-e Jomeh, Kerman Province
 Gurab, Andika, Khuzestan Province
 Gurab, Izeh, Khuzestan Province
 Gurab, Susan, Izeh County, Khuzestan Province
 Gurab-e Sorkh, Khuzestan Province
 Gurab, Boyer-Ahmad, Kohgiluyeh and Boyer-Ahmad Province
 Gurab, Kohgiluyeh, Kohgiluyeh and Boyer-Ahmad Province
 Gurab, Qaen, South Khorasan Province
 Gurab, Yazd
 Gurab-e Olya (disambiguation), two locations, Ilam Province
 Gurab-e Sofla (disambiguation), two locations, Ilam Province
 Gurab Dagchi
 Gurab Zarmikh

The term gurab is also a variation of Grab (ship).

See also
 Garab (disambiguation)